Alisson dos Santos Correa (born 3 December 1999) is a Brazilian professional footballer who plays as a defensive midfielder for USL League One club North Texas SC.

Career
On 14 January 2020, Alisson joined USL League One side North Texas SC from São Paulo. He made his debut for the club on 25 July 2020, starting in a 2–1 win over Forward Madison.

References

External links 
 

1999 births
Living people
Brazilian footballers
Brazilian expatriate footballers
Expatriate soccer players in the United States
Association football midfielders
North Texas SC players
USL League One players
Brazilian expatriate sportspeople in the United States
Footballers from São Paulo (state)
People from Leme, São Paulo